Pedro Ignacio Saenz Jr. (born October 29, 1951), known as Pete Saenz, is an American attorney and politician serving as the mayor of Laredo, Texas, a position which he assumed on November 12, 2014. He was term-limited and left the position on December 28, 2022.

Family background
Pete Saenz was born to Pedro Ignacio Saenz and Maria del Refugio ( Martinez) Saenz. Pete Saenz has two living siblings. Another sister is deceased.

Education

Saenz was educated at the Roman Catholic St. Joseph's Academy in Laredo. He thereafter obtained Bachelor of Science and Master of Science degrees in Animal Science and Range Management, respectively, from Texas A&M University–Kingsville, then known as Texas A&I University, located near Corpus Christi in Kingsville.

Community life

For twelve years, Saenz was a member of the Laredo Community College board of trustees. He also served a stint as the board president. During his tenure on the board, the South Campus was established, and most buildings on the main campus on West Washington Street were renovated. He is a former president of the South Texas Food Bank and the Laredo Affordable Housing Corporation.

2018 mayoral election

A third mayoral candidate was current city councilman Carlos Alberto "Charlie" San Miguel (born February 29, 1968). Saenz then handily won the runoff contest with 13,972 votes (64.5 percent) to Vela's 7,694 (35.5 percent).

References

External links

1951 births
21st-century American politicians
Activists from Texas
American conservationists
American politicians of Mexican descent
Catholics from Texas
Hispanic and Latino American mayors in Texas
Living people
Mayors of Laredo, Texas
Ranchers from Texas
People from Laredo, Texas
School board members in Texas
St. Mary's University School of Law alumni
Texas A&M University–Kingsville alumni
Texas Democrats
Texas lawyers